Tomorrow is a 2015 French documentary film directed by Cyril Dion and Mélanie Laurent. Faced with a future that scientists say is a great cause for concern, the film has the distinction of not giving in to catastrophism. Optimistically, it identifies initiatives that have been proven themselves in ten countries as examples of solutions to environmental and social challenges of the twenty-first century in agriculture, energy, economy, education and governance.

Tomorrow exceeded a million entries in France. It won the 2016 César Award for Best Documentary Film and was distributed in 27 countries.

Description 

The film is organised in five chapters:
 Agriculture
 Energy
 Economy
 Democracy
 Education

Production

Funding 
Tomorrow'''s production team fell short in funding. On 27 May 2014, the team launched crowdfunding activities on the internet platform KissKissBankBank with the objective of gathering 200,000 Euro to finance the film and fund the rental of shooting equipment. Two months later on 26 July the team had raised 444,390 Euro, more than a quarter of the budget of the film, with the help of 10,266 contributors.

 Contributors 

Initiatives taking place in France (including Réunion), Finland, Denmark, Belgium, India, the United Kingdom, the United States, Switzerland, Sweden and Iceland are shown. People appearng in the film include:

 Analysis 

Unlike other documentary films that focus on the cause of global environmental imbalances and their negative consequences (such as Le syndrome du Titanic, The Eleventh Hour, An Inconvenient Truth, That Should Not Be: Our Children Will Accuse Us and Home),  Tomorrow  offers a constructive approach (similar to Solutions locales pour un désordre global) putting forward solutions to environmental problems facing mankind.

 Accolades 

 Impact 
The film was shown at COP 21, European Parliament, UN and at every school in Brussels by the Brussels Minister of the Environment. More than 700 projects related to the initiatives described in the film were launched in late 2016. The film has attracted a passion for alternative forms of consumption and participation in the society it presents. The co-director Cyril Dion has since been using the film's success to support the mouvement Colibris (Hummingbird movement), a group looking forward to change modern lifestyle, e.g. during the French presidential campaign of 2017.

 See also 
 List of environmental films

 References 

Further reading
 Cyril Dion, Tomorrow: All Over the Globe, Solutions Already Exist'', Chelsea Green publishing and Actes Sud publishing, 2017.

External links 

Content in this edit is translated from the existing French Wikipedia article at Demain (film, 2015); see its history for attribution.

  (US)
  (FR)
 
 

French documentary films
Documentary films about environmental issues
Films directed by Mélanie Laurent
Films about activists
2015 documentary films
2010s French films